Juan-Pierre 'JP' Koen (born 17 October 1983) is a South African rugby union player who currently plays as a prop for  in the ITM Cup and the  in the international Super Rugby competition.

Career

Born and raised in South Africa, Koen played his youth rugby for the Falcons in his home province. However, a lack of domestic opportunities saw him move to New Zealand in 2004. He has played club rugby for the Invercargill based Pirates Old-Boys since arriving in New Zealand and eventually made the Southland ITM Cup side in 2012 where he made one appearance.

References

1983 births
Living people
South African rugby union players
South African emigrants to New Zealand
People from Springs, Gauteng
Rugby union props
Rugby union hookers
Southland rugby union players
Highlanders (rugby union) players
Rugby union players from Gauteng